Portuguese Shooting Federation, Portuguese Federação Portuguesa de Tiro is the Portuguese association for shooting sport under the International Practical Shooting Confederation (IPSC) and the International Shooting Sport Federation (ISSF).

External links 
 Official homepage of the Portuguese Shooting Federation

References 

Regions of the International Practical Shooting Confederation
Sports governing bodies in Portugal
National members of the European Shooting Confederation